The O'Kane-Jacobs House is a historic house on Rossville Road in Altus, Arkansas.  It is a single story wood-frame structure, with a single pile and an original ell extending to the west.  It has a cross-gable roof and weatherboard siding.  Its front is sheltered by a recessed porch supported by round columns, with a distinctive latticework frieze.  Built in 1881 by Francis Paine, it was purchased in 1891 by Colonel W. S. O'Kane, a prominent local businessman who owned orchards and a fruit shipping business.

The house was listed on the National Register of Historic Places in 1991.

See also
National Register of Historic Places listings in Franklin County, Arkansas

References

Houses on the National Register of Historic Places in Arkansas
Houses completed in 1914
Buildings and structures in Franklin County, Arkansas
National Register of Historic Places in Franklin County, Arkansas